Trajko Mitrović Jovanović (1904–14), known by his nom de guerre Koporan Čauš (Копоран Чауш), was a Serbian Chetnik vojvoda (commander). He was born in Orlanci near Kičevo. At first, he was a member of the IMRO, however, as many others, left that organization in the summer of 1904 and left for Serbia. He received his nickname after killing a çavuş, and wearing his bloody koporan (cape) afterwards. He participated in the victory at Čelopek (1905). He was wounded in his right hand fingers. He joined the Royal Serbian Army as a volunteer in the Balkan Wars and World War I.

See also
 List of Chetnik voivodes

References

Sources
Books

Journals

20th-century Serbian people
Serbian Chetnik Organization
Serbian military leaders
Serbian military personnel of the Balkan Wars
Serbian military personnel of World War I
People from Kičevo Municipality
Royal Serbian Army soldiers
Year of birth unknown
Year of death unknown